Ian Hamer (born 18 July 1965 in Bridgend, Glamorgan, Wales) is a British former long-distance runner. He competed in the 1992 Summer Olympics. He was the bronze medallist in the 5000 metres at the 1990 Commonwealth Games.

International competitions

Personal bests
Outdoor
1500 metres – 3:38.9h (Cwmbran 1989)
One mile – 3:56.19 (Cork 1991)
3000 metres – 7:46.40 (Auckland 1990)
2 miles – 8:22.65 (Gateshead 1992)
5000 metres – 13:09.80 (Rome 1992)
10.000 metres – 7:57.77 (Brussels 1991)
Indoor
3000 metres – 7:51.49 (Birmingham 1992)

References

All-Athletics profile

1965 births
Living people
Sportspeople from Bridgend
Welsh male long-distance runners
Welsh male middle-distance runners
Olympic athletes of Great Britain
Athletes (track and field) at the 1992 Summer Olympics
Commonwealth Games bronze medallists for Wales
Commonwealth Games medallists in athletics
Athletes (track and field) at the 1990 Commonwealth Games
World Athletics Championships athletes for Great Britain
European Athletics Championships medalists
Swansea Harriers Athletics Club
Medallists at the 1990 Commonwealth Games